Al-Sihha wal-Bi'a Sport Club, is an Iraqi football team based in Baghdad, that plays in the Iraq Division Three.

Managerial history
  Maitham Dael-Haq
 Tahseen Mohsin

See also
 2019–20 Iraq FA Cup
 2020–21 Iraq FA Cup

References

External links
 Al-Sihha wal-Bi'a SC on Goalzz.com
 Iraq Clubs- Foundation Dates

Football clubs in Iraq
2013 establishments in Iraq
Association football clubs established in 2013
Football clubs in Baghdad